Prowers County is a county located in the U.S. state of Colorado. As of the 2020 census, the population was 11,999. The county seat is Lamar. The county is named in honor of John Wesley Prowers, a leading pioneer in the lower Arkansas River valley region.

Geography

Adjacent counties
Kiowa County (north)
Greeley County, Kansas (northeast)
Hamilton County, Kansas (east)
Stanton County, Kansas (southeast/Central Time border)
Baca County (south)
Bent County (west)

Major Highways
  U.S. Highway 50
  U.S. Highway 287
  U.S. Highway 385
  U.S. Highway 400
  State Highway 89
  State Highway 196

Trails and byways
American Discovery Trail
Santa Fe Trail National Scenic Byway

Antipode
Prowers County is home of the Antipode of the Indian Ocean island of Île Amsterdam and that island's settlement, La Roche Godon, making it one of the few places in the continental United States with a non-oceanic antipode.   The center of Ile Amsterdam is at 37.8332° S, 77.5505° E; the antipode, 37.8332° N and 102.4495° W is about 10 miles southeast of Lamar.

Demographics

At the 2010 census there were 12,551 people, 4,935 households, and 3,351 families living in the county.  The population density was 7.6 people per square mile (2.9/km2).  There were 5,942 housing units at an average density of 3.6 per square mile (1.4/km2).  The racial makeup of the county was 81.0% White, 0.5% Black or African American, 0.9% Native American, 0.3% Asian, 0.0% Pacific Islander, 14.7% from other races, and 2.6% from two or more races.  35.2% of the population were Hispanic or Latino of any race.
Of the 4,935 households 49.5% were married couples living together, 12.6% had a female householder with no husband present, and 32.1% were non-families. 28.3% of households were one person and 11.5% were one person aged 65 or older.  The average household size was 2.48 and the average family size was 3.04.

The age distribution was 27.1% under the age of 18, 9.3% from 18 to 24, 22.7% from 25 to 44, 26.3% from 45 to 64, and 14.6% 65 or older.  The median age was 36.7 years. For every 100 females there were 97.7 males.  For every 100 females age 18 and over, there were 93.1 males.

The median household income was $33,969 and the median family income  was $47,052. Males working full-time and year-round had a median income of $32,359 versus $28,727 for females. The per capita income for the county was $18,429.  About 18.7% of families and 22.1% of the population were below the poverty line, including 30.8% of those under age 18 and 13.1% of those age 65 or over.

Politics
Like all of the High Plains, Prowers County is majority Republican. It has not been carried by a Democratic presidential nominee since Jimmy Carter in 1976.

Communities

City
Lamar

Towns
Granada
Hartman
Holly
Wiley

Unincorporated Community
Bristol

Historic sites
Granada Relocation Center National Historic District
Santa Fe National Historic Trail
Camp Amache
Lamar station

Gallery

See also

Outline of Colorado
Index of Colorado-related articles
National Register of Historic Places listings in Prowers County, Colorado

References

Notes

External links
Prowers County Government website
Colorado County Evolution by Don Stanwyck
Colorado Historical Society

 

 
Colorado counties
1889 establishments in Colorado
Eastern Plains
Populated places established in 1889